Journey Without End is an album by American jazz pianist Mal Waldron and soprano saxophonist Steve Lacy recorded in Paris in 1971 and released on the Japanese RCA Victor label. The album was the first of many recorded collaborations between the two musicians

Track listing 
All compositions by Mal Waldron except as indicated
 "The Fire Now — 9:05
 "Journey Without End" — 12:30
 "I Feel a Draft" (Steve Lacy) — 7:54
 "Bone" (Lacy) — 6:50
 "Mar" (Lacy) — 9:15 
Recorded at Studios Europa Sonor in Paris, France, on November 30, 1971.

Personnel
 Mal Waldron — piano
 Steve Lacy — soprano saxophone
 Kent Carter — bass
 Noel McGhie — drums

References 

RCA Victor albums
Mal Waldron albums
Steve Lacy (saxophonist) albums
1972 albums